Mervin Tran (born September 22, 1990) is a Canadian pair skater who competes for the United States with Olivia Serafini.

Competing for Japan with former partner Narumi Takahashi, he is the 2012 World bronze medalist, the 2010 World Junior silver medalist, the 2010 JGP Final champion, and 2008–10 Japanese national champion. They were the first pair to win a World medal for Japan. After their partnership ended, Tran competed one season with Natasha Purich for Canada. Competing for the United States with Marissa Castelli, he is the 2017 U.S. national silver medalist. As of 2022, Mervin coaches in the New York area

Personal life 
Tran was born in Regina, Saskatchewan. He moved to Montreal, Quebec in 2007 to train with Richard Gauthier. His parents were refugees from Vietnam and Cambodia. He competed at the provincial track and field championships in the high jump and the 100-meter hurdles, finishing fifth in the hurdles.

Early career 
Mervin Tran began skating at age four after his parents enrolled him in a hockey camp but then moved into figure skating after he took CanSkate. He was originally a single skater and placed 9th on the novice level at the 2007 Canadian Championships.

Partnership with Takahashi 

In 2007, Richard Gauthier was searching for a pair skating partner for Japanese skater Narumi Takahashi. Bruno Marcotte recommended Mervin Tran, who agreed to come to Montreal, Quebec for a tryout. Takahashi/Tran began training together in July 2007. During their career together, they trained in St. Leonard and received funding from the Japanese skating association.

2007–2008 season 
Takahashi/Tran made their international debut on the 2007–08 ISU Junior Grand Prix series, placing 12th and 6th at their events. They won the Japan Junior Championships and earned a trip to 2008 Junior Worlds, where they placed 15th.

2008–2009 season 
Takahashi/Tran placed 4th at their first Junior Grand Prix event. They won the bronze medal at their second event, qualifying them for the 2008-2009 ISU Junior Grand Prix Final, where they placed 7th. They won the senior title at the 2008–09 Japanese Championships. At the 2009 Junior Worlds, they placed 7th.

2009–2010 season 
Takahashi/Tran began their season on the Junior Grand Prix circuit. They won the bronze medal at their first event and gold at their second event, which qualified them for the 2009–10 JGP Final. They also debuted on the senior Grand Prix series with an 8th-place finish at NHK Trophy. They won silver at the JGP Final and at the Junior World Championships. They became the second pair representing Japan to medal at an ISU Championships (Yuko Kavaguti / Alexander Markuntsov were the first pair when they won silver in 2001).

2010–2011 season 
During the 2010–11 season, Takahashi/Tran won silver medals at their JGP events and qualified for the JGP Final. They won gold at the event, becoming the first pair representing Japan to win the title. They also won their first medals on the senior Grand Prix series, a bronze at 2010 NHK Trophy, and then silver at 2010 Cup of Russia. As a result, they were first alternates for the senior Grand Prix Final. They won the bronze medal at the 2011 Junior Worlds. They also made their senior World Championships debut, finishing 9th.

2011–2012 season 
During the 2011–2012 season, Takahashi/Tran placed fourth at their first Grand Prix assignment, the 2011 Skate Canada International, and then won the silver medal at their second event, 2011 NHK Trophy. In November 2011, Tran said he was considering pursuing Japanese citizenship in order to allow the couple to compete at the Olympics but said it was a difficult decision because it would mean giving up his Canadian citizenship. They became the first Japanese pair to qualify for the senior Grand Prix Final.

At the 2012 World Championships, Takahashi/Tran placed third in both programs and won the bronze medal. They became the first pair to medal for Japan at a senior World Championships. They placed third at the 2012 World Team Trophy. In April 2012, Tran said he would continue to consider an application for Japanese citizenship and the president of the Japanese Olympic Committee said he was "willing to make a special request (on behalf of Tran) to the government if necessary." In May 2012, a government official said it would be difficult to naturalize Tran because he had never resided in Japan.

2012–2013 season 
In April 2012, Takahashi dislocated her left shoulder while practicing a lift. After five or six recurrences, she decided to undergo surgery on October 30. As a result, the pair withdrew from their Grand Prix events, the 2012 Cup of China and 2012 NHK Trophy. They said they would miss about four to six months. On December 18, 2012, the Japanese Skating Federation announced that the pair had ended their partnership.

Partnership with Purich 
On March 12, 2013, Tran announced he had teamed up with Natasha Purich to compete for Canada. They debuted at the 2013 Nebelhorn Trophy and placed sixth. The pair finished fourth at the 2014 Canadian Championships.

Partnership with Castelli 
On June 10, 2014, it was announced that Tran and the United States' Marissa Castelli had formed a partnership which would train mainly in Montreal under Bruno Marcotte and to a lesser extent at the Skating Club of Boston under Bobby Martin. It was also announced that he was awaiting release from Skate Canada, indicating that they might compete for the United States.

2016–2017 season 
Tran sustained a concussion in August 2016. After winning bronze at the 2016 CS Autumn Classic International, the pair appeared at two Grand Prix events, placing 7th at the 2016 Skate America and 5th at the 2016 Trophée de France. Castelli accidentally struck Tran with her elbow during training in late December.

2017–2018 season
Tran and Castelli placed sixth at the 2018 U.S. Figure Skating Championships. They ended their partnership soon after and Tran went to California to try out with other partners.

Partnership with Serafini

2018–2019 season
Tran formed a partnership with Olivia Serafini in 2018.  Debuting at the 2019 U.S. Championships, they placed thirteenth.

2019–2020 season
Serafini/Tran made their international debut at the 2019 CS Finlandia Trophy, where they placed fifth.  Competing a second Challenger event, they were seventh at the 2019 CS Golden Spin of Zagreb, and finished the season with a seventh-place finish at the 2020 U.S. Championships.

2020–2021 season
Due to the COVID-19 pandemic affecting international travel, Serafini/Train were assigned to the 2020 Skate America, attended only by pairs training in the United States.  They finished sixth.  They went on to finish sixth as well at the 2021 U.S. Championships.

Programs

With Serafini

With Castelli

With Purich

With Takahashi

Competitive highlights
GP: Grand Prix; CS: Challenger Series; JGP: Junior Grand Prix

With Serafini for United States

With Castelli for United States

With Purich for Canada

With Takahashi for Japan

References

External links 

 
 
 Marissa Castelli / Mervin Tran at IceNetwork
 The Skating Collaborative
http://www.theskatingcollaborative.com

1990 births
Canadian male pair skaters
Canadian people of Vietnamese descent
Canadian sportspeople of Cambodian descent
Japanese male pair skaters
Living people
Figure skaters from Montreal
Sportspeople from Regina, Saskatchewan
World Figure Skating Championships medalists
World Junior Figure Skating Championships medalists
20th-century Canadian people
21st-century Canadian people